Dunheved may refer to:
 Dunheved, a Sydney locality in the suburb of St Marys, New South Wales
Launceston, Cornwall, formerly Dunheved
Dunheved (UK Parliament constituency), previous name for the Launceston parliamentary constituency